Arihia Bennett   is a New Zealand Māori leader. She is the chief executive officer of Te Rūnanga o Ngāi Tahu in New Zealand's South Island. She is a member of Ngāi Tahu, Ngāti Porou and Ngāpuhi iwi.

Biography 
Bennett attended St Margaret's College, Christchurch. She started her career in social work, and worked for the government agency Child, Youth & Family and for the non-governmental agency Barnado's. From 1999 to 2002 she was a director for Ngāi Tahu Development Corporation, and served as chair from 2002 to 2005. In 2011 Bennett was appointed chief executive of He Oranga Pounamu, the iwi (tribe) organisation responsible for health and social services in the South Island.

Bennett has held several advisory roles, including Commissioner to the Canterbury Earthquake Recovery Commission (CERC) following the September 2010 earthquake. She is a member of the Pūhara Mana Tangata Māori advisory panel to the Ombudsman’s Office and a member of the New Zealand-China Council. She has served on the boards of Barnardos NZ and the Christchurch Women’s Refuge (now known as Aviva). In 2021 Bennett was appointed chair of the Ministerial Advisory Group on the Government’s Response to the Royal Commission of Inquiry into the 2019 terrorist attack on Christchurch mosques.

Bennett is an alumna of graduate business school INSEAD Fontainebleau.

Recognition 
In 2008 Bennett was made a Member of the New Zealand Order of Merit for services to Māori and the community.

References 

Living people
People educated at St Margaret's College
Ngāi Tahu people
Ngāpuhi people
Ngāti Porou people
Members of the New Zealand Order of Merit
Year of birth missing (living people)